Johann Durand (born 17 June 1981, in Évian-les-Bains) is a French football player who plays as a goalkeeper for French club Evian in Ligue 2. He began his career with Swiss club Servette and joined Evian in 2000 when the club was known as FC Gaillard. Durand is the club's all-time leader in appearances having made over 200 since Gaillard merged with FC Ville-la-Grand in 2003 to form the current club.

References

External links 
 
 

1981 births
Living people
People from Évian-les-Bains
French footballers
Thonon Evian Grand Genève F.C. players
Ligue 2 players
Association football goalkeepers
Sportspeople from Haute-Savoie
Footballers from Auvergne-Rhône-Alpes